In mathematics, particularly in the area of abstract algebra known as group theory, a characteristic subgroup is a subgroup that is mapped to itself by every automorphism of the parent group.  Because every conjugation map is an inner automorphism, every characteristic subgroup is normal; though the converse is not guaranteed.  Examples of characteristic subgroups include the commutator subgroup and the center of a group.

Definition 

Basic properties 

Given , every automorphism of  induces an automorphism of the quotient group , which yields a homomorphism .

Related concepts

Normal subgroup 

A subgroup of  that is invariant under all inner automorphisms is called normal; also, an invariant subgroup.

Since  and a characteristic subgroup is invariant under all automorphisms, every characteristic subgroup is normal. However, not every normal subgroup is characteristic.  Here are several examples:
 Let  be a nontrivial group, and let  be the direct product, . In particular, neither of these subgroups is invariant under the automorphism, that switches the two factors.
 For a concrete example of this, let  be the Klein four-group (which is isomorphic to the direct product). Here .
 In the quaternion group of order 8, each of the cyclic subgroups of order 4 is normal, but none of these are characteristic.  However, the subgroup, is characteristic, since it is the only subgroup of order 2.
 If  is even, the dihedral group of order  has 3 subgroups of index 2, all of which are normal.  One of these is the cyclic subgroup, which is characteristic.  The other two subgroups are dihedral; these are permuted by an outer automorphism of the parent group, and are therefore not characteristic.

Strictly characteristic subgroup 
For finite groups, surjectivity of an endomorphism implies injectivity, so a surjective endomorphism is an automorphism; thus being strictly characteristic is equivalent to characteristic. This is not the case anymore for infinite groups.

Fully characteristic subgroup 
.

Every group has itself (the improper subgroup) and the trivial subgroup as two of its fully characteristic subgroups. The commutator subgroup of a group is always a fully characteristic subgroup.

Verbal subgroup 
An even stronger constraint is verbal subgroup, which is the image of a fully invariant subgroup of a free group under a homomorphism. More generally, any verbal subgroup is always fully characteristic. For any reduced free group, and, in particular, for any free group, the converse also holds: every fully characteristic subgroup is verbal.

Transitivity 
.

Moreover, while normality is not transitive, it is true that every characteristic subgroup of a normal subgroup is normal.

Similarly, while being strictly characteristic (distinguished) is not transitive, it is true that every fully characteristic subgroup of a strictly characteristic subgroup is strictly characteristic.

Containments 
Every subgroup that is fully characteristic is certainly strictly characteristic and characteristic; but a characteristic or even strictly characteristic subgroup need not be fully characteristic.

The center of a group is always a strictly characteristic subgroup, but it is not always fully characteristic.

The relationship amongst these subgroup properties can be expressed as:
Subgroup ⇐ Normal subgroup ⇐ Characteristic subgroup ⇐ Strictly characteristic subgroup ⇐ Fully characteristic subgroup ⇐ Verbal subgroup

Examples

Finite example 
Consider the group  (the group of order 12 that is the direct product of the symmetric group of order 6 and a cyclic group of order 2).

Cyclic groups 
Every subgroup of a cyclic group is characteristic.

Subgroup functors 
The derived subgroup (or commutator subgroup) of a group is a verbal subgroup.  The torsion subgroup of an abelian group is a fully invariant subgroup.

Topological groups 
The identity component of a topological group is always a characteristic subgroup.

See also
 Characteristically simple group

References

Subgroup properties